Løkta Church is a chapel of the Church of Norway in Dønna Municipality in Nordland county, Norway. It is located in the village of Sandåker on the island of Løkta. It is an annex chapel in the Dønna parish which is part of the Nord-Helgeland prosti (deanery) in the Diocese of Sør-Hålogaland. The white, wooden chapel was built in a long church style in 1968. The chapel seats about 90 people.

See also
List of churches in Sør-Hålogaland

References

Dønna
Churches in Nordland
Wooden churches in Norway
20th-century Church of Norway church buildings
Churches completed in 1968
1968 establishments in Norway
Long churches in Norway